Ford Center for the Performing Arts can refer to:

Ford Center for the Performing Arts Oriental Theatre, now known as the James M. Nederlander Theatre, Chicago
Ford Center for the Performing Arts, New York City, renamed the Hilton Theatre, then the Foxwoods Theatre, and now the Lyric Theatre
Ford Centre for the Performing Arts, North York, Toronto, now the Toronto Centre for the Arts
Gertrude C. Ford Center for the Performing Arts, University of Mississippi